Lin Ching-hsuan may refer to:

Lin Ching-hsuan (writer) (1953–2019), Taiwanese writer
Lin Ching-hsuan (long jumper) (born 1992), Taiwanese long jumper

See also
Li Ching-hsüan